Axis at Brickell Village is a high-rise building complex in the Brickell district of Miami, Florida. The complex, designed by the renowned Arquitectonica architecture firm, consists of two residential twin towers, Axis at Brickell Village North Tower and Axis at Brickell Village South Tower. Both towers were topped off in mid-2007, meaning that they have reached their final heights and were completed in 2008. The towers rise  each, with 40 floors. They are among the tallest buildings in Miami. The buildings are located at 1100 Southwest 1st Avenue. Axis on Brickell is located immediately adjacent to the Brickell Metrorail and Metromover station.

See also
 List of tallest buildings in Miami

External links
 Axis at Brickell Village on Emporis
 Axis at Brickell Village on SkyscraperPage

Residential buildings completed in 2008
Residential skyscrapers in Miami
Twin towers
2008 establishments in Florida
Arquitectonica buildings